PGF may refer to:

 Paternal grandfather
 Patterson–Gimlin film, purporting to show Bigfoot
 IATA code of Perpignan–Rivesaltes Airport, France
 Placental growth factor, a human gene
 Vector graphics language in the PGF/TikZ pair
 Precision guided firearm
 Probability-generating function
 Progressive Graphics File, a file format